Ilse Steinegger (born 8 August 1925) is an Austrian former high and long jumper who competed in the 1948 Summer Olympics.

References

1925 births
Living people
Austrian female high jumpers
Austrian female long jumpers
Olympic athletes of Austria
Athletes (track and field) at the 1948 Summer Olympics